See the list of places in Scotland for places in other counties.

This article is a list of any town, village, hamlet or settlement, in the Highland council area of Scotland. The area encompassed by the Highland council is smaller than that encompassed by the Scottish Highlands. For the Scottish Gaelic equivalents of the place names in this list, see the appropriate section at List of Scottish Gaelic place names.

A
Aberarder, Aberchalder, Abriachan, Achachork, Achanalt
Achandunie, Acharacle, Achany, Achaphubuil, Acharn, Achateny, Ach' An Todhair, Achentoul
Achgarve, Achiemore (near Durness), Achiemore (Strath Halladale), A'Chill, Achiltibuie
Achina, Achinahuagh, Achintee, Achintee, Achintraid, Achininver, Achinduich, Achingills, Achmore
Achnabat, Achnacarnin, Achnacarry, Achnaconeran, Achnacloich, Achnagarron, Achnaha, Achnahanat, Achnahannet
Achnasaul, Achnasheen, Achnashellach, Achriesgill, Ackergill
Achosnich, Achuvoldrach, Achvarasdal, Achylyness, Achvaich
Aigas, Aird of Sleat, Alcaig, Aldourie, An Ard, Ankerville
Allanfearn, Allangrange Mains, Alligin, Alligin Shuas, Allt-na-h-Airbhe, Allt-nan-Sugh, Alness
Altandhu, Altass, Altnaharra, Altrua, Alvie, Anaheilt, Anancaun, Annat
Annishader, Applecross, Arabella, Ard-dhubh, Ardachu, Ardaneaskan, Ardarroch, Ardcharnich, Ardchronie, Ardclach
Ardechive, Ardelve, Ardendrain, Ardersier, Ardery
Ardessie, Ardgay, Ardindrean, Ardmair, Ardmolich, Ardmore
Ardnagrask, Ardnastang, Ardross, Ardshealach, Ardtoe, Ardtornish
Ardullie, Ardvannie, Ardvasar, Arisaig, Arivegaig
Armadale (Skye), Armadale (Sutherland), Arnisdale, Arnish, Arnisort, Arpafeelie, Ashaig
Attadale, Auchentoul, Auchindrean, Auchtertyre, Auckengill
Aultbea, Aultgrishan, Aultiphurst, Aundorach
Avielochan, Aviemore, Avoch

 

B
Back of Keppoch, Backies, Badachro, Badcall
Badcaul, Badnaban, Badninish, Badluarach, Badrallach
Badicaul, Balachuim, Balbeg, Balblair
Balchladich, Balchraggan, Balchrick, Balgown
Balintore, Balintraid, Ballachulish, Balleigh, Balloch
Balmacara, Balmacara Square, Balmeanach (Raasay), Balmeanach (Skye)
Balnabruich, Balnafoich, Balnain, Balnapaling, Balnacoil
Balnacra, Balnakeil, Balvraid, Baramore
Barbaraville, Barnyards, Bualintur, Beauly
Beoraidbeg, Benavie, Berriedale, Bernisdale
Bettyhill, Big Sand, Bishop Kinkell
Blaich, Blairmore, Blarnalearoch, Boat of Garten
Bogallan, Bogroy, Bohuntine
Bonar Bridge, Borgue, Bornesketaig, Borreraig, Bottacks, Borve, Bower
Bracadale, Branault, Brawl, Brae
Brea of Achnahaird, Breckrey, Broadford, Brochel
Brogaig, Brora, Broubster, Brough
Bruan, Buldoo, Bunacaimb, Bunarkaig, Bunloit, Bunchrew

 

C
Camas Luinie, Camastianavaig, Camault Muir, Camore, Camuscross
Camusnagaul, Camusteel, Camusterrach, Canisbay, Canna
Cannich, Carbost (Loch Harport), Carbost (Portree)
Carnach, Carrbridge, Castletown, Catlodge, Cawdor, Charlestown (Black Isle), Charlestown (Wester Ross)
Clachtoll, Claigan
Clashnessie, Cleadale, Clephanton, Clovullin, Clyth, Clunes
Coille Mhorgil, Coillore, Colbost, Coldbackie, Conon Bridge
Conordan, Contin, Corntown, Corpach, Corran (Lochaber), Corran (Skye and Lochalsh), Corriechatachan
Corrimony, Corry, Coulags, Coylumbridge, Cove
Craigton, Crask, Crask of Aigas
Croftnacreich, Croick, Cromarty, Crosskirk, Croy
Culbokie, Culburnie, Culcairn, Culcharry, Culduie
Cullicudden, Culloden, Culkein, Culrain

 

D
Dalchalm, Dalchreichart, Dalelia
Dalhalvaig, Dalnabreck, Dalnavert, Dalreavoch
Dalwhinnie, Daviot, Delny, Digg, Dingwall
Dochgarroch, Doll, Dornie, Dornoch, Dores
Dorrery, Doune, Dounie, Dounreay, Drimnin, Droman, Druimarben, Druimindarroch
Drumbeg, Drumbuie, Drumfearn
Drumnadrochit, Drumuie, Drumuillie, Drynoch
Duirinish (Lochalsh), Duirinish (Skye), Duisdalebeg, Duisdalemore, Duisky, Dulnain Bridge, Dunan
Dunbeath, Duncanston, Dundonnell
Dunnet, Dunnet Forest, Dunnet Head, Duntulm, Dunvegan, Durness, Duthil

 

E
Earlish, East Croachy, East Mey
Easter Kinkell, Edderton, Edinbane
Eilean Donan, Eilean Shona
East Langwell, Elgol, Elishader
Elphin, Embo, Erbusaig, Eriboll, Errogie, Essich, Etteridge, Evanton
Evelix, Eynort, Eyre (Raasay), Eyre (Skye)

 

F
Fanagmore, Farr (Strathnairn), Farr (Sutherland), Fasach, Fassfern
Feorlig, Fearn, Fearns, Ferindonald, Feriniquarrie, Ferness, Fersit
Ferrindonald, Fisherton, Fiskavaig
Fiunary, Flashader, Flodigarry, Fodderty, Foindle, Forse, Forss
Fort Augustus, Fort George, Fort William
Forsinard, Fortrose, Foyers, Fresgoe, Freswick

 

G
Galltair, Galtrigill, Garafad, Garros
Gartymore, Garve, Gairloch, Gairlochy, Galmisdale
Geary, Gedintailor, Gillen, Gills
Glaichbea, Glame, Glasphein, Glen Affric
Glenancross, Glenborrodale, Glencoe, Glendale
Glenfinnan, Glenelg, Glengrasco, Glenmore, Glenuig
Golspie, Gorstan, Gorthleck, Grudie, Gruids

 

H
Halistra, Halkirk, Hallin, Ham, Harlosh, Harrapool, Haster
Heaste, Helmsdale, Heights of Kinlochewe, Highbridge, Hill of Fearn
Hilton, Hilton of Cadboll, Houstry, Huna, Hungladder

 

I
Idrigill, Incheril, Inchmore (Kirkhill), Inchmore (Strathfarrar), Inchnadamph, Inchree, Insh, Inshegra, Inver
Inverailort, Inveralligin, Inveran, Inverdruie, Inverarish, Inverchoran
Invergordon, Inverfarigaig, Invergarry, Inverinate, Inverkirkaig, Inverlochy
Invermoidart, Invermoriston, Invernaver, Inverness, Inverroy, Invershin, Isle of Skye, Isleornsay

 

J
 Jamestown, Jemimaville, John o' Groats

 

K
Keiss, Kensaleyre, Kentra, Kilchoan, Kildary, Kildonan
Killen, Killilan, Killimster, Kilmaluag, Kilmarie, Kilmonivaig, Kilmorack, Kilmore, Kilmory
Kilmuir (Black Isle), Kilmuir (Easter Ross), Kilmuir (Skye), Kilphedir, Kiltarlity, Kilvaxter
Kinbrace, Kincardine, Kincraig, Kingsburgh, Kingussie
Kinloch Laggan, Kinlochbervie, Kinlochchiel, Kinlochewe, Kinlochleven
Kinlochmoidart, Kirkhill, Kirkibost
Knockan, Knockfarrel, Kyle of Lochalsh, Kyleakin, Kylerhea, Kylesku, Kylestrome

 

L
Laga, Laggan (Badenoch), Laggan (Great Glen), Laide (Sutherland), Laide (Ross-shire), Lairg, Lamington, Landhallow
Latheron, Latheronwheel, Leachkin, Lealt
Leckfurin, Leckmelm, Ledgowan, Lednagullin
Leirinmore, Lenie, Lentran, Lephin, Letterewe, Letterfearn
Letters (Ross and Cromerty), Lewiston, Liddesdale
Linsidemore, Linicro, Littleferry, Littlemill
Lochailort, Loch Alsh, Lochaline
Lochbay, Lochcarron, Lochinver
Lochslin, Logie Hill
Londubh, Lonemore (Ross and Cromerty), Lonemore (Sutherland)
Lothbeg, Lower Badcall, Lower Breakish, Lower Diabaig
Lower Milovaig, Luib, Lubcroy, Lubinvullin, Lusta, Lybster, Lynchat, Lynne of Gorthleck

 

M
Maligar, Mallaig, Marishader, Marybank, Maryburgh
Mellon Charles, Mellon Udrigle, Melness, Melvaig, Melvich, Merkadale, Mey
Milovaig, Midtown, Milton (Easter Ross), Milton (Glenurquhart), 
Morar, Morefield, Morvich
Mountgerald, Moy, Muie
Muir of Allangrange, Muir of Ord, Muir of Tarradale, Muirshearlich
Murlaggan, Munlochy, Murkle, Mybster

 

N
Nairn, Nedd, Nethy Bridge
Newlands of Geise, Newfield, Newport
Newton of Ardtoe
Newton of Ferintosh, Newton of Kinkell
Newtonmore, Nigg
North Ballachulish, North Erradale, North Kessock
Nostie, Nybster

 

O
Ockle, Oldshore Beg, Oldshoremore, Ollach, Onich
Ormiscaig, Ormsaigmore, Opinan (Gairloch), Opinan (Laide), Ose

 

P
Papigoe, Peinachorran, Peinchorran, Peiness, Penifiler
Piperhill, Pitcalnie, Pittentrail, Plockton, Polbain
Polglass, Polloch, Poles, Poolewe
Portgower, Portnancon, Portnalong, Portnaluchaig, Portmahomack
Port Henderson, Port Mòr, Portree, Portskerra, Portuairk
Proncycroy, Pulrossie

 

R
Raasay, Raddery, Ramasaig, Ramscraig, Ranochan, Ratagan
Rearquhar, Reay, Reaster
Redpoint, Regoul, Reiff, Reiss, Resaurie, Resipole, Rhelonie
Rhiconich, Rhiroy, Rhue
Roadside, Roag, Rockfield, Rogart
Rosehall, Rosemarkie, Roshven
Roster, Roybridge, Ruilick, Rùm, Ruthven (Badenoch)

 

S
Saasaig, Salen (Ardnamurchan), Sallachy, Saltburn, Sand, Sangobeg, Sanna
Sarclet, Saval, Satran, Scalpay (Inner Hebrides)
Scarfskerry, Sconser, Scourie
Scrabster, Sculamus, Shandwick, Shebster
Shiel Bridge, Shieldaig, Shieldaig, Shielfoot, Shona Beag
Skeabost, Skelpick
Skerray, Skinnet, Skinidin, Skirza, Skulamus
Skullomie, Skye of Curr, Sligachan, Sluggans, Smerral, Smithton, Sordale
South Ballachulish, South Duntulm, South Erradale, South Garvan
South Laggan, South Oscaig, Spean Bridge
Spinningdale, Spittal, Staffin, Staxigoe, Stein, Stenscholl
Strath, Strathan (Melness), Strathan (Sutherland), Strathaird, Strathcanaird, Strathcarron
Strathpeffer, Strathrusdale, Stromeferry, Stronchreggan, Stronenaba, Strontian
Stoer, Struan, Struy, Suladale, Swiney, Swordale, Swordly, Syre

 

T
Taagan, Tain, Talisker, Talladale, Talmine, Tarbet, Tarskavaig, Teangue
Thrumster, Thurso
Tokavaig, Tomatin, Tomchrasky, Tomnacross, Tongue, Tore
Torgormack, Tornagrain, Torridon, Torrin, Torrisdale
Torvaig, Toscaig, Totaig, Tote, Toulvaddie
Tournaig, Trantlebeg, Trantlemore, Treaslane, Trislaig, Trotternish, Trumpan

 

U
Uig (Duirinish), Uig (Snizort), Uigshader, Ulbster, Ullapool, Ullinish
Upper Ardchronie, Upper Badcall, Upper Bighouse, Upper Breakish
Upper Camster, Upper Lybster, Upper Milovaig, Urray

 

V
Valtos, Vatten

 

W
Waternish, Watten, Westhill, West Clyne
West Helmsdale, West Langwell, Wester Aberchalder, Westerdale
Westfield, Weydale,  Whitebridge, Whiterow, Wick, Windhill

 

See also
Caithness, Sutherland, Ross-shire
Cromartyshire, Inverness-shire
Morayshire, Nairnshire, Argyll
Scottish Highlands
List of towns and villages in the Scottish Highlands

Geography of Highland (council area)
Lists of places in Scotland
Populated places in Scotland